Ghum (also spelt Ghoom) is a small hilly neighbourhood in the Darjeeling Himalayan hill region of West Bengal, India. It comes under ward number one of the Darjeeling Municipality. Ghum railway station of the Darjeeling Himalayan Railway is the highest railway station in India. The place is the home of the Ghum Monastery and the Batasia Loop, a bend of the Darjeeling Himalayan Railway.

Geography

Location

Area overview
The map alongside shows the northern portion of the Darjeeling Himalayan hill region. In Darjeeling Sadar subdivision 61% of the total population lives in the rural areas and 39% of the population lives in the urban areas. There are 78 tea gardens/ estates (the figure varies slightly according to different sources), producing and largely exporting Darjeeling tea in the district. It engages a large proportion of the population directly/ indirectly. Some tea gardens were identified in the 2011 census as census towns or villages. Such places are marked in the map as CT (census town) or R (rural/ urban centre). Specific tea estate pages are marked TE.

Note: The map alongside presents some of the notable locations in the subdivision. All places marked in the map are linked in the larger full screen map.

War Memorial
Darjeeling hills has a high concentration of Indian Army servicemen and ex-servicemen. Since independence in 1947, seventy-six soldiers of the Darjeeling area have died in service. In 1976, Manish Gupta, then Deputy Commissioner of Darjeeling took the initiative to build a War Memorial and a committee was formed. In 1984, Batasia was selected as the site of the War Memorial. In 1991, Subhas Ghising, Chairman of Darjeeling Gorkha Autonomous Hill Council, agreed to finance the construction of the War Memorial.

The bronze statue was sculptured by Gautam Pal of Krishnanagar.

Monasteries
Yi Gha Choling Gompa is more popularly known as Ghum Monastery. located opposite to the Ghoom Post Office is a road called Monastery road which leads to Yiga Choling Monastery. Many travel guides and taxi drivers take tourist to the monastery located below Hill Cart road and Ghum Railway station which is Samten Choeling monastery and called it old Ghoom monastery as it is on the main road and easier for them. It was established in 1850 by the famous Mongolian astrologer and monk Sokpo Sherab Gyatso. He was later succeeded by very venerable late Khabje Domo Geshe Ngawang Kalsang Rinpoche. It was during Domo Geshi Rinpoche's tenure that the 15 feet high image of the great Maitreya Buddha was commissioned. It still stands majestically inside the main monastery for all to glimpse and pay respects. There are three other gompas in Ghum: Samten Choeling, the Sakyachoeling, and the Phin.

Ghum Hill
On the Ghum-Sukhiapokri road, at an altitude of  stands a huge detached rock offering a grand view of the Balsan Valley and the hills beyond. Garg World, an amusement park is the latest attraction.

Transport

Ghum is the meeting point of several roads. The Hill Cart Road from Siliguri to Darjeeling runs through the town. Another road leads to Mongpu and thence to the Kalimpong-Siliguri road. There is a road to Kurseong via Dow Hill.

Education
Ghoom Jorebunglow College was established in 2004 at Ghum. It offers honours courses in Nepali, English, history, geography, political science, economics, sociology, education and a general course in arts.

Ghoom Boys School is a private boys only higher secondary school.

Ghoom Girls Higher Secondary School is an English-medium girls only institution with facilities for teaching from class V to class XII.

Healthcare
There is a primary health centre, with 6 beds at Ghum.

Ghum picture gallery

References

Tourist attractions in Darjeeling
Geography of Darjeeling district